Joseph John Avila (born October 11, 1991) is an American professional basketball player for Libertadores de Querétaro of the Liga Nacional de Baloncesto Profesional (LNBP). He played college basketball for Navy and Colorado State.

High school career
Avila attended McAllen High School. As a senior, he averaged 21.6 points, 11.9 rebounds, 3.7 assists, 2.1 blocks and 1.6 steals, being named to the Class 5A Texas Association of Basketball Coaches all-state team. After graduating, Avila was the school's all-time leading scorer with 2,865 career points.

College career
Avila began his career at Navy, where he played for two years and won the Patriot League Rookie of the Year after ranking second on the team in scoring (11.5), rebounding (5.3), assists (74) and free throw percentage (.829).

After playing at Navy, he transferred to South Texas College where he redshirted and then transferred to Colorado State where he averaged 16.7 points and 7.4 rebounds. He earned first-team All-Mountain West honors as a senior in 2014–15 after averaging 16.7 points, 7.5 rebounds and 2.8 assists. In his four college seasons, he saw action in started 103 of 115 games and posted averages of 15.1 points, 6.8 rebounds, 2.8 assists and 1.6 steals in 31.5 minutes.

Professional career

Stella Artois Leuven Bears (2015–2016)
After going undrafted in the 2015 NBA draft, Avila joined the Houston Rockets for the 2015 NBA Summer League. On July 27, he signed with Stella Artois Leuven Bears of the Belgian League. In 18 games, he averaged 11.1 points, 5.1 rebounds and 3.2 assists.

Windy City Bulls (2016–2017)
In July, 2016, Avila joined the New York Knicks for the 2016 NBA Summer League. On September 26, 2016, he signed with the Chicago Bulls, but was waived on October 21 after appearing in two preseason games. On October 30, 2016, he was acquired by the Windy City Bulls of the NBA Development League as an affiliate player of Chicago.

Texas Legends (2017–2018)
On January 28, 2017, he was traded to the Texas Legends.

Agua Caliente Clippers (2018–2021)
On December 16, 2018, the Texas Legends announced that they had acquired Ryan Boatright from the Agua Caliente Clippers for Avila. On February 6, 2020, Avila had 21 points, nine rebounds, two assists and three steals in a loss to the Texas Legends.

Fuerza Regia de Monterrey (2020) 
In October 2020, Avila joined the Fuerza Regia de Monterrey of the Mexican Liga Nacional de Baloncesto Profesional (LNBP) ahead of the playoffs. He was named Finals MVP after leading the Fuerza Regia to a 3–1 championship series win over the Aguacateros de Michoacán.

Salt Lake City Stars (2021–2022) 
On December 8, 2021, Avila was acquired by the Salt Lake City Stars. He was waived on February 2, 2022.

Return to Fuerza Regia de Monterrey (2022) 
Avila returned to the Fuerza Regia de Monterrey in July 2022. He earned LNBP All-Star honors.

Personal life
He is the son of J.J. Avila Sr. and Vicki Avila. He majored in communication studies at Colorado State.

References

External links
 Colorado State Rams bio
 Navy Midshipmen bio
 RealGM profile
 Sports-Reference profile
 NBA G League profile

1991 births
Living people
Agua Caliente Clippers players
American expatriate basketball people in Belgium
American expatriate basketball people in Mexico
American men's basketball players
Basketball players from Texas
Colorado State Rams men's basketball players
Forwards (basketball)
Fuerza Regia de Monterrey players
Leuven Bears players
Navy Midshipmen men's basketball players
People from McAllen, Texas
Salt Lake City Stars players
Texas Legends players
Windy City Bulls players
Military personnel from Texas